2009–10 Hong Kong Second Division League is the 96th season of a football league in Hong Kong, Hong Kong Second Division League.

Changes from last season

From Second Division
Promoted to First Division
 Advance Tai Chung
 Shatin
Relegated to Third Division
 Kwok Keung
Quit Hong Kong football league system
 Tung Po

To Second Division
Relegated from First Division
 Mutual
Promoted from Third Division League
 Derico Friends
 Tuen Mun

Name changing
 Rangers renamed as Ongood
 Double Flower renamed as Advance Double Flower

League table

Top scorers

Only players scored ≥10 is shown.

Notes

Hong Kong Second Division League seasons
Hong
2009–10 in Hong Kong football leagues